Flight 712 may refer to the following aviation accidents:
Aer Lingus Flight 712, crashed on 24 March 1968
BOAC Flight 712, crashed on 8 April 1968

0712